Daniel H. Halberstam (born 1966 or 1967) is a legal scholar focusing on comparative constitutional law, transnational law and European law. Halberstam is the Eric Stein Collegiate Professor of Law and Director of the European Legal Studies Program at the University of Michigan Law School. He is also professor at College of Europe.

Halberstam earned his B.A. summa cum laude and Phi Beta Kappa, in mathematics from Columbia University and his J.D. from Yale Law School where he served as an articles editor of the Yale Law Journal. He then served as a law clerk to Judge Patricia Wald of the U.S. Court of Appeals for the D.C. Circuit and for Justice David Souter of the U.S. Supreme Court.

Halberstam is married to Ellen D. Katz, also a professor at the University of Michigan Law School.

See also 
 List of law clerks of the Supreme Court of the United States (Seat 3)

References 

1960s births
Living people
American people of German-Jewish descent
University of Michigan Law School faculty
Yale Law School alumni
Columbia College (New York) alumni
Academic staff of the College of Europe
Law clerks of the Supreme Court of the United States